Karen Simmer  is an Australian paediatrician and professor of Newborn Medicine at the University of Western Australia and is director of two neonatal intensive care units at hospitals in Perth. She also runs the WA Human Milk Bank and is team leader, neonatal gut health, nutrition and development at the Telethon Kids Institute.

Simmer completed her secondary education at Abbotsleigh in Sydney and undertook an MB BS at the University of Sydney. She graduated from the  University of London with a PhD in perinatal nutrition and later completed the Advanced Management Program at Harvard University.

Simmer was appointed an Officer of the Order of Australia in the 2015 Queen's Birthday Honours for "distinguished service to medicine in the field of paediatrics, particularly neonatal and perinatal nutrition, to medical education as an academic, researcher and clinician, and to the community". She was elected Fellow of the Australian Academy of Health and Medical Sciences in 2017.

References 

Living people
Year of birth missing (living people)
University of Sydney alumni
Academic staff of the University of Western Australia
Australian paediatricians
Women pediatricians
Officers of the Order of Australia
Fellows of the Australian Academy of Health and Medical Sciences
Alumni of the University of London